Portland Parks & Recreation (PP&R) is a Bureau of the City of Portland, Oregon that manages the city parks, natural areas, recreational facilities, gardens, and trails. The bureau employs a total of 4,366 employees as of March 4, 2019.  3,752 are casual, 559 are regular and the remainder are other categories.

The development of Portland's park system was largely guided by the 1903 Olmsted Portland park plan.

Following a City Council decision, smoking, vaping and marijuana use have been entirely banned since July 2015 in all Portland city parks and nature areas.

In March 2021, Oregon Department of Environmental Quality fined PP&R nearly half a million dollars for failing to establish a storm water control system to prevent toxic runoff water from an industrial land the park purchased in 2004 and 2009 for building new entrance and trailhead to Forest Park.

See also

 List of parks in Portland, Oregon

References

External links

 Portland Parks & Recreation

Government of Portland, Oregon